Transatlantic Pictures was founded by Alfred Hitchcock and longtime associate Sidney Bernstein at the end of World War II in preparation for the end of Hitchcock's contract with David O. Selznick in 1947. In 1945, Hitchcock and Bernstein were involved with a planned 80-minute documentary on Nazi concentration camps which was eventually shown on television in the US and UK as Memory of the Camps (1985). They planned to produce feature films in both Hollywood and London.

The first two Transatlantic films, Hitchcock's Rope (1948) and Under Capricorn (1949), both released in the US by Warner Bros., had poor box office returns. Rope was banned in several US cities due to the themes of homosexuality, and Under Capricorn was overshadowed by Ingrid Bergman's extramarital affair with director Roberto Rossellini.

A third Hitchcock film, Stage Fright (1950) filmed on location in London, began as a Transatlantic production, but was taken over by Warner Bros. as a Warners production. After the release of I Confess in early 1953, Hitchcock and Bernstein planned to film the 1948 David Duncan novel The Bramble Bush as a Transatlantic release. However, script and budget problems during production prompted Hitchcock and Bernstein to dissolve the partnership, with Warners giving Hitchcock permission to go ahead with Dial M for Murder (1954) instead.

Filmography
 Rope (1948) 
 Under Capricorn (1949)
 Strangers on a Train (1951)

See also
List of unproduced Hitchcock projects

References

External links
Hollywood Renegades article

Alfred Hitchcock
American film studios
Mass media companies established in 1945
American companies established in 1945